James Paul Flanagan (April 20, 1881 – April 21, 1947) was a Major League Baseball center fielder. He played for the Pittsburgh Pirates just at the end of the 1905 season (September 25-October 7).
  
Flanagan played well during his time with the Pirates.  In seven games he hit .280 (7-for-25) with one double, one triple, three runs batted in, and seven runs scored.  He also had three stolen bases.  In the field he handled 19 chances flawlessly for a fielding percentage of 1.000.

Two of his famous teammates on the Pirates were future Hall of Famers Honus Wagner and Fred Clarke.

Flanagan died at the age of 66 in Wilkes-Barre, Pennsylvania.

External links
Baseball Reference
Retrosheet

Major League Baseball center fielders
Baseball players from Pennsylvania
People from Kingston, Pennsylvania
Pittsburgh Pirates players
1881 births
1947 deaths
Toledo Mud Hens players
Rochester Bronchos players
Buffalo Bisons (minor league) players
Notre Dame Fighting Irish baseball players
Sacramento Sacts players
Northampton Meadowlarks players
New Britain Perfectos players
Holyoke Papermakers players
Harrisburg Senators players
Meriden Silverites players